Bifidobacterium is a genus of gram-positive, nonmotile, often branched anaerobic bacteria.  They are ubiquitous inhabitants of the gastrointestinal tract though strains have been isolated from the vagina and mouth (B. dentium) of mammals, including humans.  Bifidobacteria are one of the major genera of bacteria that make up the gastrointestinal tract microbiota in mammals. Some bifidobacteria are used as probiotics.

Before the 1960s, Bifidobacterium species were collectively referred to as Lactobacillus bifidus.

History

In 1899, Henri Tissier, a French pediatrician at the Pasteur Institute in Paris, isolated a bacterium characterised by a Y-shaped morphology ("bifid") in the intestinal microbiota of breast-fed infants and named it "bifidus". In 1907, Élie Metchnikoff, deputy director at the Pasteur Institute, propounded the theory that lactic acid bacteria are beneficial to human health. Metchnikoff observed that the longevity of Bulgarians was the result of their consumption of fermented milk products. Metchnikoff also suggested that "oral administration of cultures of fermentative bacteria would implant the beneficial bacteria in the intestinal tract".

Metabolism
The genus Bifidobacterium possesses a unique fructose-6-phosphate phosphoketolase pathway employed to ferment carbohydrates.

Much metabolic research on bifidobacteria has focused on oligosaccharide metabolism, as these carbohydrates are available in their otherwise nutrient-limited habitats. Infant-associated bifidobacterial phylotypes appear to have evolved the ability to ferment milk oligosaccharides, whereas adult-associated species use plant oligosaccharides, consistent with what they encounter in their respective environments. As breast-fed infants often harbor bifidobacteria-dominated gut consortia, numerous applications attempt to mimic the bifidogenic properties of milk oligosaccharides. These are broadly classified as plant-derived fructooligosaccharides or dairy-derived galactooligosaccharides, which are differentially metabolized and distinct from milk oligosaccharide catabolism.

Response to oxygen
The sensitivity of members of the genus Bifidobacterium to O2 generally limits probiotic activity to anaerobic habitats. Recent research has reported that some Bifidobacterium strains exhibit various types of oxic growth. Low concentrations of O2 and CO2 can have a stimulatory effect on the growth of these Bifidobacterium strains. Based on the growth profiles under different O2 concentrations, the Bifidobacterium species were classified into four classes: O2-hypersensitive, O2-sensitive, O2-tolerant, and microaerophilic. The primary factor responsible for aerobic growth inhibition is proposed to be the production of hydrogen peroxide (H2O2) in the growth medium. A H2O2-forming NADH oxidase was purified from O2-sensitive Bifidobacterium bifidum and was identified as a b-type dihydroorotate dehydrogenase. The kinetic parameters suggested that the enzyme could be involved in H2O2 production in highly aerated environments.

Genomes
Members of the genus Bifidobacterium have genome sizes ranging from 1.73 (Bifidobacterium indicum) to 3.25 Mb (Bifidobacterium biavatii), corresponding to 1,352 and 2,557 predicted protein-encoding open reading frames, respectively.

Functional classification of Bifidobacterium genes, including the pan-genome of this genus, revealed that 13.7% of the identified bifidobacterial genes encode enzymes involved in carbohydrate metabolism.

Clinical uses
Adding Bifidobacterium as a probiotic to conventional treatment of ulcerative colitis has been shown to be associated with improved rates of remission and improved maintenance of remission. Some Bifidobacterium strains are considered as important probiotics and used in the food industry. Different species and/or strains of bifidobacteria may exert a range of beneficial health effects, including the regulation of intestinal microbial homeostasis, the inhibition of pathogens and harmful bacteria that colonize and/or infect the gut mucosa, the modulation of local and systemic immune responses, the repression of procarcinogenic enzymatic activities within the microbiota, the production of vitamins, and the bioconversion of a number of dietary compounds into bioactive molecules. Bifidobacteria improve the gut mucosal barrier and lower levels of lipopolysaccharide in the intestine.

Bifidobacteria may also improve abdominal pain in patients with irritable bowel syndrome (IBS) though studies to date have been inconclusive.

Naturally occurring Bifidobacterium spp. may discourage the growth of Gram-negative pathogens in infants.

Mother's milk contains high concentrations of lactose and lower quantities of phosphate (pH buffer). Therefore, when mother's milk is fermented by lactic acid bacteria (including bifidobacteria) in the infant's gastrointestinal tract, the pH may be reduced, making it more difficult for Gram-negative bacteria to grow.

Bifidobacteria and the infant gut 
The human infant gut is relatively sterile up until birth, where it takes up bacteria from its surrounding environment and its mother. The microbiota that makes up the infant gut differs from the adult gut. An infant reaches the adult stage of their microbiome at around 3 years of age, when their microbiome diversity increases, stabilizes, and the infant switches over to solid foods. Breast-fed infants are colonized earlier by Bifidobacterium when compared to babies that are primarily formula-fed. Bifidobacterium is the most common bacteria in the infant gut microbiome. There is more variability in genotypes over time in infants, making them less stable compared to the adult Bifidobacterium. Infants and children under 3 years old show low diversity in microbiome bacteria, but more diversity between individuals when compared to adults.  Reduction of Bifidobacterium and increase in diversity of the infant gut microbiome occurs with less breast-milk intake and increase of solid food intake. Mammalian milk all contain oligosaccharides showing natural selection . Human milk oligosaccharides are not digested by enzymes and remain whole through the digestive tract before being broken down in the colon by microbiota. Bifidobacterium species genomes of B. longum, B. bifidum, B. breve contain genes that can hydrolyze some of the human milk oligosaccharides and these are found in higher numbers in infants that are breast-fed. Glycans that are produced by the humans are converted into food and energy for the B. bifidum. showing an example of coevolution.

Species 
The genus Bifidobacterium comprises the following species:

 B. actinocoloniiforme Killer et al. 2011
 B. adolescentis Reuter 1963 (Approved Lists 1980)
 B. aemilianum Alberoni et al. 2019
 B. aerophilum Michelini et al. 2017
 B. aesculapii Modesto et al. 2014
 B. amazonense Lugli et al. 2021
 B. angulatum Scardovi and Crociani 1974 (Approved Lists 1980)
 B. animalis (Mitsuoka 1969) Scardovi and Trovatelli 1974 (Approved Lists 1980)
 B. anseris Lugli et al. 2018
 B. apousia Chen et al. 2022
 B. apri Pechar et al. 2017
 B. aquikefiri Laureys et al. 2016
 B. asteroides Scardovi and Trovatelli 1969 (Approved Lists 1980)
 B. avesanii Michelini et al. 2019
 B. biavatii Endo et al. 2012
 B. bifidum (Tissier 1900) Orla-Jensen 1924 (Approved Lists 1980)
 B. bohemicum Killer et al. 2011
 B. bombi Killer et al. 2009
 B. boum Scardovi et al. 1979 (Approved Lists 1980)
 B. breve Reuter 1963 (Approved Lists 1980)
 B. callimiconis Duranti et al. 2019
 B. callitrichidarum Modesto et al. 2018
 B. callitrichos Endo et al. 2012
 B. canis Neuzil-Bunesova et al. 2020
 B. castoris Duranti et al. 2019
 B. catenulatum Scardovi and Crociani 1974 (Approved Lists 1980)
 B. catulorum Modesto et al. 2018
 B. cebidarum Duranti et al. 2020
 B. choerinum Scardovi et al. 1979 (Approved Lists 1980)
 B.choladohabitans  Chen et al. 2022
 B. choloepi Modesto et al. 2020
 B. colobi Lugli et al. 2021
 B. commune Praet et al. 2015

 B. criceti Lugli et al. 2018
 "B. crudilactis" Delcenserie et al. 2007
 B.cuniculi  Scardovi et al. 1979 (Approved Lists 1980)

 B. dentium Scardovi and Crociani 1974 (Approved Lists 1980)
 B. dolichotidis Duranti et al. 2019
 "B. eriksonii" Cato et al. 1970
 B. erythrocebi Neuzil-Bunesova et al. 2021
 B. eulemuris Michelini et al. 2016
 B. faecale Choi et al. 2014
 B. felsineum Modesto et al. 2020
 B. gallicum Lauer 1990
 B. gallinarum Watabe et al. 1983
 B. globosum (ex Scardovi et al. 1969) Biavati et al. 1982
 B. goeldii Duranti et al. 2019
 B. hapali Michelini et al. 2016
 B.  Lugli et al. 2018
 B. indicum Scardovi and Trovatelli 1969 (Approved Lists 1980)

 B. italicum Lugli et al. 2018
 B. jacchi Modesto et al. 2019

 B. lemurum Modesto et al. 2015
 B. leontopitheci Duranti et al. 2020
 B. longum Reuter 1963 (Approved Lists 1980)
 B. magnum Scardovi and Zani 1974 (Approved Lists 1980)
 B.margollesii  Lugli et al. 2018
 B. merycicum Biavati and Mattarelli 1991
 B. miconis Lugli et al. 2021
 B. miconisargentati Lugli et al. 2021
 B. minimum Biavati et al. 1982
 B. mongoliense Watanabe et al. 2009
 B. moraviense Neuzil-Bunesova et al. 2021
 B. moukalabense Tsuchida et al. 2014
 B. myosotis Michelini et al. 2016
 B. oedipodis Neuzil-Bunesova et al. 2021
 B. olomucense Neuzil-Bunesova et al. 2021
 B. panos Neuzil-Bunesova et al. 2021
 B. parmae Lugli et al. 2018
 "B. platyrrhinorum" Modesto et al. 2020
 B. pluvialisilvae Lugli et al. 2021
 B. polysaccharolyticum Chen et al. 2022
 B. pongonis Lugli et al. 2021
 B. porcinum (Zhu et al. 2003) Nouioui et al. 2018
 B. primatium Modesto et al. 2020
 B. pseudocatenulatum Scardovi et al. 1979 (Approved Lists 1980)
 B. pseudolongum Mitsuoka 1969 (Approved Lists 1980)
 B. psychraerophilum Simpson et al. 2004
 B. pullorum  Trovatelli et al. 1974 (Approved Lists 1980)
 B. ramosum Michelini et al. 2017
 B. reuteri Endo et al. 2012
 B. rousetti Modesto et al. 2021
 "B. ruminale" Scardovi et al. 1969
 B. ruminantium Biavati and Mattarelli 1991

 B. saguini Endo et al. 2012
 B. saguinibicoloris Lugli et al. 2021
 "B. saimiriisciurei" Modesto et al. 2020
 B. samirii Duranti et al. 2019
 B. santillanense Lugli et al. 2021
 B. scaligerum Modesto et al. 2020
 B. scardovii Hoyles et al. 2002
 B. simiarum Modesto et al. 2020
 B. simiiventris Lugli et al. 2021
 B. stellenboschense Endo et al. 2012

 B. subtile Biavati et al. 1982

 B. thermacidophilum Dong et al. 2000

 B. thermophilum corrig. Mitsuoka 1969 (Approved Lists 1980)
 B. tibiigranuli Eckel et al. 2020
 B. tissieri corrig. Michelini et al. 2016

 B. tsurumiense Okamoto et al. 2008
 "B. urinalis" Hojo et al. 2007
 B. vansinderenii Duranti et al. 2017
 B. vespertilionis Modesto et al. 2021
 B. xylocopae Alberoni et al. 2019

See also 
 List of bacterial vaginosis microbiota
 Probiotic
 Proteobiotics
 Prebiotics

References

External links 
 Bifidobacterium at Microbe Wiki
 Genomes Online Database contains many Bifidobacterium genome projects
 Comparative Analysis of Bifidobacterium Genomes (at DOE's IMG system)
 Bifidobacterium at BacDive -  the Bacterial Diversity Metadatabase
Spotlight on Bifidobacteria

Bifidobacteriales
Gut flora bacteria
Bacterial vaginosis
Bacteria genera